The Puma is a family of Italian light wheeled armoured fighting vehicle family, consisting of the Puma 6×6 and the Puma 4×4. The vehicles were developed and are produced by the Consorzio Iveco Fiat – Oto Melara for the Italian Army. First prototypes completed in 1988, with a total of five testbed vehicles being completed by 1990.

The 4x4 variant carries 3 troop members plus the driver, the 6×6 variant carries 6 troops plus driver.

History 

At first the Puma was intended to complement the Centauro wheeled tank destroyer in service with the Italian Army's Cavalry Regiments, but today most infantry regiments of the Italian Army have also been equipped with Pumas.

Eight cavalry regiments and two special forces regiments are equipped with a total of 330 Puma 4×4 vehicles.

250 Puma 6×6 vehicles are in service with the Italian Army Lagunari Regiment "Serenissima", the "Folgore" Parachutist Brigade, the 66th Air Assault Regiment and the Alpini Regiments.

In Italian service, the 4×4 variant carries two soldiers in addition to the driver and gunner, and is used in pairs for battlefield reconnaissance. The 6X6 version carries four soldiers plus driver and gunner, and together with another Puma 6×6 can carry an entire Italian infantry squad of eight men.

At the end of 1999, the Italian Army ordered 580 Puma vehicles, 250 of the 6×6 configuration, and 330 4×4 vehicles. First vehicles were completed in mid-2003.

In 2007 the Italian Army ordered 19 Hitrole 12.7mm machine gun remote controlled turrets from Oto Melara and is planning to add extra armor to the vehicle.

In March 2013, Italy donated 20 of its Puma 4×4 vehicles to the Libyan National Army to face terrorism threats and reaffirm friendly ties with the former colony.

Operators 

  Argentine Army – 2 units to train peacekeepers at Campo de Mayo
  Djibouti: 14 Puma 4x4 donated by Italy 
  Italian Army
  Libyan National Army – 20 Puma 4×4 vehicles donated from the Italian Army
  Pakistani Army – 79 Puma 6x6 sold from italian stocks

See also 
 VBL of France
 Komatsu LAV of Japan
 Otokar Cobra of Turkey

References

External links 
 Official website

Infantry fighting vehicles of Italy
Wheeled armoured personnel carriers
Iveco vehicles
Six-wheeled vehicles
Military vehicles introduced in the 2000s
Armoured personnel carriers of Italy
Armoured personnel carriers of the post–Cold War period
Infantry fighting vehicles of the post–Cold War period